Frederick John Barritt  was a justice of the peace and member of the parliament of Bermuda for the United Bermuda Party for the constituency of Devonshire South. He served as speaker and deputy speaker of the House of Assembly, minister of transport and minister of marine and air services.

References 

United Bermuda Party politicians
Year of birth missing
Year of death missing
Bermudian justices of the peace
Commanders of the Order of the British Empire